Harry Dingley (19 April 1903 – 20 August 1988) was a British boxer. He competed in the men's featherweight event at the 1924 Summer Olympics.

References

External links
 

1903 births
1988 deaths
Scottish male boxers
British male boxers
Olympic boxers of Great Britain
Boxers at the 1924 Summer Olympics
Boxers from Glasgow
Featherweight boxers